Paal Christian Alsaker (born 6 November 1973) is a retired Norwegian football midfielder.

Hailing from the island Stord, he grew up in the club Solid. Until 1993 he played for Stord, joining Solid in the autumn and then Vard ahead of the 1994 1. divisjon season. In 1996 he returned to Solid, then signed for Trott in 1997. Coming in contact with the agent Terje Simonsen, he trialled unsuccessfully with Dunfermline and later secured a move to Estonian football. While here he was also loaned out to English second-tier club Stockport County for a less fruitful spell. He nonetheless wanted to move away from the Estonian league, and in 1999 he secured a contract with Norwegian sovereigns Rosenborg. However, after only one league game he again moved abroad in the summer of 1999, to Greek Ionikos. Ahead of the 2000 season he returned to Norway and Strømsgodset from Drammen, his most stable outfit where he stayed for four seasons.

After a tenure near home in 2004, in FK Haugesund, he settled in Eastern Norway and played seven seasons for Notodden FK interrupted by one season in Mjøndalen IF, then hobby-level football for Drammen FK, SBK Skiold and Åskollen FK.

References

1973 births
Living people
People from Stord
Norwegian footballers
Stord IL players
SK Vard Haugesund players
FC Flora players
Stockport County F.C. players
Rosenborg BK players
Ionikos F.C. players
Strømsgodset Toppfotball players
FK Haugesund players
Notodden FK players
Mjøndalen IF players
Norwegian First Division players
Meistriliiga players
Eliteserien players
Super League Greece players
Association football midfielders
Norwegian expatriate footballers
Expatriate footballers in Estonia
Norwegian expatriate sportspeople in Estonia
Expatriate footballers in England
Norwegian expatriate sportspeople in England
Expatriate footballers in Greece
Norwegian expatriate sportspeople in Greece
Sportspeople from Vestland